Maraschi is a surname. Notable people with the surname include:

Anthony Maraschi (1820–1897), Italian Roman Catholic priest 
Bartolomeo Maraschi (died 1487), Italian Roman Catholic bishop
Laura Maraschi (born 1942), Italian astronomer
Mario Maraschi (1939–2020), Italian footballer